Asa Hartshorne was a United States Army officer who died in 1794 during the Northwest Indian War. He was among the signers of the Treaty with the Six Nations and the Treaty with the Wyandot at Fort Harmar on January 9, 1789. Hartshorne became the namesake of a 1790 frontier skirmish near Maysville, Kentucky.

Biography
Hartshorne hailed from Connecticut and joined the Army in 1787. 

As an ensign in the First American Regiment, he signed the 1789 Treaty of Fort Harmar 

He traveled west from Fort Harmar that August, along with his fellow junior officer Jacob Kingsbury, under the command of Captain David Strong. On 30 May 1790, Hartshorne commanded a party near Limestone, Kentucky, that was attacked in retaliation for an attack on the Shawnee village of Chalawgatha by Charles Scott a month earlier. Hartshorne reported 8 people missing after the attack and 5 killed, including 3 children. This frontier skirmish is known as "Hartshorne's Defeat (1790)."

While stationed in Fort Washington at Cincinnati, Ohio, Hartshorne participated in the Harmar campaign, an assault on Native American villages deep in Ohio Territory. He and Captain John Armstrong were the only two active duty Army officers to survive when a force under Kentucky colonel John Hardin approached the Miami village of Little Turtle on 19 October 1790.

Hartshorne was promoted to lieutenant on 4 March 1791 and returned to Connecticut to recruit for the newly-formed Second American Regiment.  

Hartshorne was promoted to captain in the 1st Sub-Legion on 1 September 1792. 

In January 1794, shortly after the construction of Fort Recovery, Hartshorne was tasked with building a road north to the village of Simon Girty. He was killed on 30 June 1794 during the Siege of Fort Recovery, when he refused to surrender to Thomas McKee. When his body was recovered the following day, it had been mutilated. However, two leather hearts had been placed in his chest as a testament to his courage. Lieut. Thomas T. Underwood made the following entry in his journal regarding the death of Hartshorne:

Recognition
Christopher W. Wingate in Military Professionalism and the Early American Officer Corps, 1789-1796 (2013) wrote:

Notes

References

External links
 Signer Record: Asa Hartshorn, Indian Land tenure Foundation

American people of the Northwest Indian War
Battles in Kentucky
United States Army officers
1794 deaths
American military personnel killed in the Northwest Indian War
United States Army personnel of the Indian Wars